Mehdiabad-e Yek (also Romanized as Mehdīābād-e Yek; also known as Mehdiabad) is a village in Shurab-e Tangazi Rural District in the Central District of Kuhrang County, Chaharmahal and Bakhtiari Province, Iran. At the 2006 census, its population was 224 in 43 families. The village is populated by Lurs.

References 

Populated places in Kuhrang County
Luri settlements in Chaharmahal and Bakhtiari Province